Xincheng is a town in Binhai New Area of Tianjin, China.

References

Towns in Tianjin